The next Galician regional election will be held no later than Friday, 16 August 2024, to elect the 12th Parliament of the Autonomous Community of Galicia. All 75 seats in the Parliament will be up for election.

Overview

Electoral system
The Parliament of Galicia is the devolved, unicameral legislature of the autonomous community of Galicia, having legislative power in regional matters as defined by the Spanish Constitution and the Galician Statute of Autonomy, as well as the ability to vote confidence in or withdraw it from a regional president.

Voting is on the basis of universal suffrage, which comprises all nationals over 18 years of age, registered in Galicia and in full enjoyment of their political rights. Additionally, Galicians abroad are required to apply for voting before being permitted to vote, a system known as "begged" or expat vote. The 75 members of the Parliament of Galicia are elected using the D'Hondt method and a closed list proportional representation, with an electoral threshold of five percent of valid votes—which includes blank ballots—being applied in each constituency. Seats are allocated to constituencies, corresponding to the provinces of A Coruña, Lugo, Ourense and Pontevedra, with each being allocated an initial minimum of 10 seats and the remaining 35 being distributed in proportion to their populations.

The use of the D'Hondt method may result in a higher effective threshold, depending on the district magnitude.

Election date
The term of the Parliament of Galicia expires four years after the date of its previous election, unless it is dissolved earlier. The election decree shall be issued no later than the twenty-fifth day prior to the date of expiry of parliament and published on the following day in the Official Journal of Galicia (DOG), with election day taking place between the fifty-fourth and the sixtieth day from publication. The previous election was held on 12 July 2020, which means that the legislature's term will expire on 12 July 2024. The election decree must be published in the DOG no later than 18 June 2024, with the election taking place up to the sixtieth day from publication, setting the latest possible election date for the Parliament on Saturday, 16 August 2024.

The president has the prerogative to dissolve the Parliament and call a snap election, provided that it does not occur before one year has elapsed since a previous dissolution under this procedure. In the event of an investiture process failing to elect a regional president within a two-month period from the first ballot, the Parliament is to be automatically dissolved and a fresh election called.

Parliamentary composition
The table below shows the composition of the parliamentary groups in the Parliament at the present time.

Parties and candidates
The electoral law allows for parties and federations registered in the interior ministry, coalitions and groupings of electors to present lists of candidates. Parties and federations intending to form a coalition ahead of an election are required to inform the relevant Electoral Commission within ten days of the election call, whereas groupings of electors need to secure the signature of at least one percent of the electorate in the constituencies for which they seek election, disallowing electors from signing for more than one list of candidates.

Below is a list of the main parties and electoral alliances which will likely contest the election:

Opinion polls
The table below lists voting intention estimates in reverse chronological order, showing the most recent first and using the dates when the survey fieldwork was done, as opposed to the date of publication. Where the fieldwork dates are unknown, the date of publication is given instead. The highest percentage figure in each polling survey is displayed with its background shaded in the leading party's colour. If a tie ensues, this is applied to the figures with the highest percentages. The "Lead" column on the right shows the percentage-point difference between the parties with the highest percentages in a poll. When available, seat projections determined by the polling organisations are displayed below (or in place of) the percentages in a smaller font; 38 seats are required for an absolute majority in the Parliament of Galicia.

References
Opinion poll sources

Other

Galicia
2020s